South Pacific (also known as Rodgers & Hammerstein's South Pacific) is a 2001 American romantic musical television film based on the 1949 stage musical of the same name, itself an adaptation of James A. Michener's 1947 book Tales of the South Pacific.

Directed by Richard Pearce, the film stars Glenn Close, Harry Connick Jr. and Rade Šerbedžija (credited as Rade Sherbedgia). The screenplay, adapted by Joshua Logan (who directed the previous 1958 film version) and Lawrence D. Cohen, tells the story of a war-torn romance between a young American nurse (Close) and an older French plantation owner (Sherbedgia).

The film premiered on March 26, 2001 on ABC to mixed critical reviews, praising its performances but criticizing the rearranged song order and removal of certain numbers deemed politically incorrect.

Cast
 Glenn Close as Ensign Nellie Forbush
 Harry Connick Jr. as Lt. Joseph Cable
 Rade Sherbedgia as Emile de Becque
 Jack Thompson as Capt. George Brackett
 Lori Tan Chinn as Bloody Mary
 Ilene Graff as Singing Ngana
 Natalie Mendoza as Liat
 Simon Burke as Harbison
 Steve Bastoni as Lt. Buzz Adams
 Kimberley Davies as Luann
 Robert Pastorelli as Luther Billis
 Craig Ball as Austin
 Damon Herriman as Professor
 Salvatore Coco as DeVito
 Peter Lamb as Bruno
 Steve Le Marquand as Stewpot
 Simon Pryce as Bass Sergeant

Production

Principal photography took place primarily in Australia, with some scenes shot in Moorea, an island close to Tahiti.

Several new scenes, such as Nellie and Emile's first meeting at the officer's club, were added, and a new character was created to serve as Nellie's best friend and confidante. The sex scenes between Liat and Cable are also dealt with more frankly in the film than in the original 1949 musical.

Music
Sixteen songs from the musical are featured in the film, although "Happy Talk" was omitted and "Bali Ha'i" was cut in half. Vincent Paterson choreographed the musical numbers.

A soundtrack was released on March 20, 2001.
 "Overture"
 "There Is Nothing Like a Dame"
 "A Cock-Eyed Optimist" - Close
 "Bloody Mary"
 "Bali Ha'i"
 "Twin Soliloquies" - Close
 "Some Enchanted Evening" - Šerbedžija
 "Dites-moi"
 "Younger Than Springtime" - Connick Jr.
 "I'm Gonna Wash That Man Right Outa My Hair" - Close and Graff
 Some Enchanted Evening (Reprise) - Close
 "I'm in Love with a Wonderful Guy" - Close and Graff
 "You've Got to Be Carefully Taught" – Connick Jr.
 "This Nearly Was Mine"
 "Honey Bun" - Close and Graff
 "Finale Ultimo" - Close
 "My Girl Back Home" - Close and Connick Jr.

Release

Critical reception
Julie Salamon of The New York Times praised the film and, particularly, Close's performance, writing, "Ms. Close, lean and more mature, hints that a touch of desperation lies in Nellie's cockeyed optimism. 'I'm stuck like a dope with a thing like hope' means one thing when you are in your 20's, something else when you are not." She also noted that the movie "is beautifully produced, better than the stagy 1958 film. ... The other cast members, including Ms. Close, also sing well." The New York Post wrote that "Notions of racism toward the islanders were glossed over in the 1958 movie, but in tonight's remake, the racial themes are brought to the surface, to the production's advantage ... there's a heightened sense of drama and tension in the remake because the war is closer at hand ... the rewards are great."

The Washington Post noted:

There was criticism by some, for example, theatre critic and historian John Kenrick because the order of the songs was changed, and because Rade Sherbedgia, unlike previous Emiles, did not have an operatic singing voice. Playbill reported that "Internet chat room visitors have grumbled that Close is too old for the role of Nellie Forbush, who, in the song, 'A Cock-Eyed Optimist', is described as 'immature and incurably green'", but also that "[co-producer] Cohen said the 'May–December' romance plot point ... has less resonance with audiences today and it was cut. Nellie is ageless, in effect."

In the 2008  Oxford Companion to the American Musical, Thomas Hischak wrote:

Home media

The film was released on DVD on August 28, 2001. Special features include deleted scenes and a behind-the-scenes featurette.

In 2013, it was reissued on DVD by Mill Creek Entertainment in a double-feature set alongside the 1993 TV remake of Gypsy.

See also
 List of television films produced for American Broadcasting Company

References

External links
 
 
 

2001 television films
2001 films
2000s English-language films
2001 comedy-drama films
2000s musical films
2000s romantic musical films
Films directed by Richard Pearce
Films based on musicals
Films about interracial romance
Musical film remakes
Musical television films
Films based on works by James A. Michener
Films based on adaptations
Tales of the South Pacific